Gudvangen is a village in Aurland Municipality in Vestland county, Norway. It is a popular tourist destination and is located at the end of the Nærøyfjord where the Nærøydalselvi river empties into the fjord. The European route E16 highway passes by the village. Heading southwest on the highway leads to Voss municipality while heading northeast the E16 enters the Gudvanga Tunnel on its way to the villages of Flåm, Undredal, and Aurlandsvangen. The Kjelfossen waterfall is located just to the southeast of the village.

Name
The name Gudvangen comes from the old farm name.  The first element is gud meaning "god".  The vang(en) refers to the open space in front of a place of worship like Aurlandsvangen and Vossevangen. In Gudvangen, there have been several places of worship since pre-Christian times.

Media gallery

References

Villages in Vestland
Aurland